The lung-on-a-chip is a complex, three-dimensional model of a living, breathing human lung on a microchip. The device is made using human lung and blood vessel cells and it can predict absorption of airborne nanoparticles and mimic the inflammatory response triggered by microbial pathogens. It can be used to test the effects of environmental toxins, absorption of aerosolized therapeutics, and the safety and efficacy of new drugs. It is expected to become an alternative to animal testing.

The lung-on-a-chip places two layers of living tissues—the lining of the lung's air sacs and the blood vessels that surround them—across a porous, flexible boundary. Air is delivered to the lung lining cells, a rich culture medium flows in the capillary channel to mimic blood, and cyclic mechanical stretching is generated by a vacuum applied to the chambers adjacent to the cell culture channels to mimic breathing.

The research findings for lung-on-a-chip were published in the June 25, 2010, issue of Science, the academic journal of the American Association for the Advancement of Science.  The research was funded by the National Institutes of Health, the American Heart Association, and the Wyss Institute for Biologically Inspired Engineering at Harvard University.

Inventors
The technology was developed by Donald E. Ingber, M.D., Ph.D., an American cell biologist who is the Founding Director of the Wyss Institute for Biologically Inspired Engineering at Harvard University, and Dan Dongeun Huh, Ph.D., who was a Technology Development Fellow at the Wyss Institute and is now Wilf Family Term Chair Assistant Professor in Bioengineering at the University of Pennsylvania. The device was created using a microfabrication strategy known as soft lithography that was pioneered by George M. Whitesides, an American chemist, who is a professor of chemistry at Harvard, as well as a Wyss Institute core faculty member.

Testing
The response of the lung-on-a-chip to inhaled living pathogens was tested by introducing E. Coli bacteria into the air channel on the lung air sac side of the device, while flowing white blood cells through the channel on the blood vessel side. The lung cells detected the bacteria and, through the porous membrane, activated the blood vessel cells, which in turn triggered an immune response that ultimately caused the white blood cells to move to the air chamber and destroy the bacteria.

Researchers also introduced a variety of nanoscale particles (such as those found in commercial products, and in air and water pollution) into the air channel. Several types of these nanoparticles entered the lung cells and caused the cells to overproduce free radicals and to induce inflammation.  Many of the particles passed through the model lung into the blood channel, and mechanical breathing was found to greatly enhance nanoparticle absorption from the air sac into the blood.

The Wyss Institute team is working to build other organ models, such as a gut-on-a-chip, as well as bone marrow and even cancer models. They are exploring the potential for combining organ systems, such as linking a breathing lung-on-a-chip to a beating heart-on-a-chip. The engineered organ combination could be used to test inhaled drugs and to identify new and more effective therapeutics that lack adverse cardiac side effects.

See also
 Organ-on-a-chip

References

Lung
Biotechnology